1996 World Ice Hockey Championships may refer to:
 1996 Men's World Ice Hockey Championships
 1996 World Junior Ice Hockey Championships